Among those who were born in the London Borough of Newham, or have dwelt within the borders of the modern borough, including Stratford, are (alphabetical order):

Notable people associated with Newham 
Sha Yaa Bin Abraham-Joseph, better known as 21 Savage, rapper
Ade Adepitan, British television presenter and wheelchair basketball player
Chuba Akpom, footballer
Chuks Aneke, footballer
Tony Banks, Baron Stratford, Labour Party politician
Yxng Bane, rapper and singer
Jim Barrett, footballer
Kieran Agard, footbatter
Wally Bellett, footballer
Honor Blackman, actress
Reece Burke, footballer
Clive Burr, musician 
Sol Campbell, ex-footballer and manager
Charlie Colkett, footballer
Vera Day, actress and glamour model 
Jermain Defoe, footballer
Richard Digance, folk singer
Kristian Digby, television presenter
Danny Dyer, actor
Stan Earle, footballer
Idris Elba, actor 
Medy Elito, footballer
Perry Fenwick, actor
Bryan Forbes, actor, screenwriter, film producer
Lancey Foux, rapper and singer
Kojo Funds, rapper and singer
Ernie Gregory, footballer
Peter Grotier, footballer
Walter Hancock, inventor
Gerard Manley Hopkins, poet
Michael Hector, football
Luke Howard, meteorologist
Chris Hughton, ex-footballer and manager
Henry Hughton, ex-footballer with Crystal Palace and Leyton Orient
J Hus, rapper
Tony Jarrett, Olympic gold-medal sprint and hurdling athlete
Matt Johnson, singer and songwriter
Anna Kingsford, theosophist and author
Kano, rapper and actor
Ghetts, rapper
Ezri Konsa, footballer 
Nina Frances Layard, archaeologist and poet
Joan Littlewood, director of the Theatre Workshop at the Theatre Royal
Dame Vera Lynn, singer
Steve Marriott, musician and lead singer of The Small Faces and Humble Pie
Stephen Mulhern, television presenter, entertainer, and former magician
Anna Neagle, actress
Dawn Neesom, journalist
Malachi Napa, footballer
Mark Noble, footballer and captain of West Ham United
Christine Ohuruogu, Olympic gold-medal winning sprinter
Godfrey Poku, footballer
Dominic Poleon, footballer
Tony Rivers, singer
Steve John Shepherd, actor
Gwyneth Strong, actor 
Tinchy Stryder, rapper
Crazy Titch, rapper
Tony Way, actor
David Webb, footballer
Bert Weedon, guitarist
Vanessa White, singer with The Saturdays
Rob Whiteman, public servant, CEO of CIPFA
Benjamin Zephaniah, dub poet
Arnold Schwarzenegger, Trained  as a weightlifter in Forest Gate.
Note that William Shakespeare did not come from Stratford, Newham, but from Stratford-upon-Avon, which is known simply as "Stratford" to many people.

References

Newham
People from the London Borough of Newham